Copt Hewick is a village and civil parish in the Harrogate district of North Yorkshire, England. The village lies about two miles east of Ripon.  It had a population of 180 in 2004 according to the North Yorkshire County Council, increasing to 253 at the 2011 census.

The name of the village derives from the Old English Coppede hēah wīc, which means High specialised farm. The Copt element refers to the hill that the village stands on.

References

External links

Villages in North Yorkshire
Civil parishes in North Yorkshire